The 1999 U.S. Figure Skating Championships took place on February 7–14, 1999 at the Delta Center in Salt Lake City, Utah. Medals were awarded in four colors: gold (first), silver (second), bronze (third), and pewter (fourth) in five disciplines – men's singles, ladies' singles, pair skating, ice dancing, and compulsory figures (mixed) – across three levels: senior, junior, and novice.

The event was used to determine the U.S. teams for the 1999 World Championships and the 1999 Four Continents Championships.

It was the final U.S. Championships that included a competition in figures, which had appeared at every U.S. nationals since it began. For the only time, figures were a mixed event separated only by the three levels, with men and women competing against each other. The final skater to trace a figure at Nationals was Lauren Hill.

Senior results

Men
The 1999 Championships were the first of three U.S. men's titles (1999, 2000, 2003) for Michael Weiss. This was the third appearance in the U.S. Championships for silver medalist, Trifun Zivanovic; and was his highest placing. Bronze medalist Timothy Goebel went on to win the Championships the following year.

Ladies
For 1999 ladies' champion Michelle Kwan, this was the third of her nine U.S. titles. Silver medalist Naomi Nari Nam was appearing for the first time in the senior ladies' competition. Despite her second-place finish, she was not sent to the World Championships because she was not age-eligible. The 1999 World Junior Figure Skating Championships, the corresponding World-level event for which she was age-eligible, had been held earlier that season. The bronze medal win was Angela Nikodinov's first time on the U.S. ladies' medals stand. She would take 3rd place again in 2001.

Pairs

Ice dancing

Junior results

Men

Ladies

Pairs

Ice dancing

Novice results

Men

Ladies

Pairs

Ice dancing

Figures results

Senior

Junior

Novice

External links
 1999 U.S. Figure Skating Championships
 1999 State Farm U.S. Figure Skating Championships

U.S. Figure Skating Championships
United States Figure Skating Championships, 1999
United States Figure Skating Championships, 1999
February 1999 sports events in the United States